Bennett Ratliff (born August 18, 1961) is an American civil engineer, businessman, and politician who served as a Republican member of the Texas House of Representatives from district 115 in Dallas County and currently serves as a Planning and Zoning Commissioner in Plano, Texas.

Early life and education

Career

Professional career 
He founded The Ratliff Group, LLC, an engineering and construction management firm, in Coppell in 2002 and has grown it to be one of the most successful and respected firms in its market segment. In 2013, Ratliff was given the Distinguished Engineering Award from the Texas Engineering Foundation of the Society of Professional Engineers in recognition of his distinguished service to the engineering profession and in 2015 was inducted into the Academy of Distinguished Alumni for the University of Texas Cockrell School of Engineering. In 2016, Ratliff was again recognized by his peers in the Texas Society of Civil Engineers as the Citizen Engineer of the Year, for his service to the State of Texas and his community.

Prior to his legislative term, Ratliff was a nine-year elected member and vice president of the board of trustees of the Coppell Independent School District, had twice served as a delegate to the State Republican Party Convention and had been involved in a number of local and state Republican campaigns.

Texas House of Representatives 

Representative Ratliff served on the House committees of (1) Appropriations and (2) Public Education. He authored eighteen bills and by the end of the session, thirteen of his priority issues had become law, the best record of any freshman in the 83rd Legislative Session.

In his bid for a second term, Ratliff lost the Republican nomination to a 2012 tea party opponent, Matt Rinaldi, who received 4,167 votes (50.6 percent) to Ratliff's 4,075 votes (49.44 percent) in the March 4, 2014 Republican primary. Rinaldi, an Irving lawyer and one of Ratliff's opponents two years before, had extensive support from a special interest PAC, Empower Texans. On March 1, 2016, Ratliff tried unsuccessfully to regain his seat, but lost again to the Empower Texans backed Rinaldi in the Republican primary 8,804 to 7,668 (53.45% to 46.55%)

In the 2018 General Election, Ratliff broke with the Republican Party to endorse Democratic candidate Julie Johnson for Ratliff's former Texas House seat, due to the need for the legislature to address Ratliff's top priority, Texas' Public Education Finance system. Ratliff proved to be correct in his support, as Johnson went on to win the seat with a double-digit margin  over Matt Rinaldi, and became the first Democratic representative to co-author House Bill 3  to reform and overhaul the Texas School finance system, a bill that passed with overwhelming bipartisan support and was signed into law by Republican Governor Greg Abbott.

Legislative positions

Ratliff took a leadership role in education issues and helped pass HB 5 to reform high school graduation requirements in Texas which passed the House unanimously. He also authored and passed HB 2824 to reduce state regulation of high-performing public schools and HB 2824 to reduce high-stakes testing in public schools. Despite unanimous support of both bills in the House and Senate, the bills were vetoed by Governor Rick Perry on very narrow grounds. Because of this work on behalf of the children of Texas, Ratliff has been named to the "Legislative Honor Roll" by the Texas PTA and recognized as a legislative "Champion" by the Retired Teachers Association. The Texas PTA also selected Ratliff to receive one of their highest honors by naming him an Honorary Life Member for outstanding service to the children and youth of Texas.

Ratliff also added language to a proposed constitutional amendment to fund highway construction in Texas prohibiting new revenue from being used to build or finance toll roads, the voters approved the amendment with 80% in favor.

For his solid pro-life voting record he received a 100% rating from Texas Right to Life and earned the support of Texas Alliance for Life and Texans for Life in his re-election bid.

Ratliff received an A Rating from the NRA and TSRA for his defense of Second Amendment Rights.

Planning & Zoning Commission
In 2019 Ratliff and his family moved to Plano for undisclosed personal reasons.  In October 2021, the Plano City Council appointed Ratliff to serve on the Planning & Zoning Commission recognizing his professional experience and engineering background in urban land planning and development.

Personal life 
Ratliff and his wife, Rebecca, or Beccy, a former public schoolteacher, have three grown children and one grandchild. He and Beccy continue to be active community volunteers for many groups including Special Olympics, Metrocrest Services and My Possibilities.

References

 

1961 births
Living people
People from Fort Worth, Texas
People from Coppell, Texas
Businesspeople from Texas
School board members in Texas
Republican Party members of the Texas House of Representatives
Cockrell School of Engineering alumni
21st-century American engineers